Walter "Walt" Tennant (1 January 1921  – death unknown) was an English professional rugby league footballer who played in the 1930s, 1940s and 1950s.

Background
Tennant's birth was registered in Pontefract district, West Riding of Yorkshire, England his death details are unknown.

Playing career
Tennant made his début for the Featherstone Rovers on Wednesday 30 August 1939, he appears to have scored no drop-goals (or field-goals as they are currently known in Australasia), but prior to the 1974–75 season all goals, whether; conversions, penalties, or drop-goals, scored 2-points, consequently prior to this date drop-goals were often not explicitly documented, therefore '0' drop-goals may indicate drop-goals not recorded, rather than no drop-goals scored. In addition, prior to the 1949–50 season, the archaic field-goal was also still a valid means of scoring points.

County honours
Tennant won a cap for Yorkshire while at the Featherstone Rovers; during the 1949–50 season against Cumberland.

County Cup Final appearances
Tennant played right-, i.e. number 3, in the Featherstone Rovers' 12-9 victory over Wakefield Trinity in the 1939–40 Yorkshire County Cup Final during the 1939–40 season at Odsal Stadium, Bradford on Saturday 22 June 1940.

Testimonial match
Tennant's benefit season at the Featherstone Rovers took place during the 1950–51 season.

Genealogical information
Walter Tennant was the son of the rugby league footballer; Buff Lord, and the younger brother of Margaret Tennant (birth registered during first ¼ 1919 in Pontefract district), and the older brother of the rugby league footballer; Nelson Tennant, Alice Tennant (birth registered during second ¼ 1925 in Pontefract district), Maurice Tennant (birth registered during second ¼ 1928 in Pontefract district - death registered during second ¼ 1929 (aged-1) in Pontefract district), and the rugby league footballer; Alan Tennant. Walter Tennant's marriage to Doris (née Glassell) was registered during second ¼ 1944 in Pontefract district. They had children; the future rugby league footballer; Clive M. Tennant.

References

External links
Search for "Tennant" at rugbyleagueproject.org

1921 births
English rugby league players
Featherstone Rovers players
Place of death missing
Rugby league centres
Rugby league players from Pontefract
Wakefield Trinity players
Year of death missing
Yorkshire rugby league team players